Pharaoh Rebirth (ファラオリバース) is a video game for Windows created by independent Japanese game developer Krobon Station.

Story 
Pharaoh Rebirth is a metroidvania game starring a bunny named Dr. Jonathan Banfield, set in Egypt.

Development 
Krobon says he was inspired by Castlevania: Symphony of the Night, and wished to make a game that appealed to him.

Gameplay 
Pharaoh Rebirth is a 2D action exploration game, using pixel art.

Jonathan is a rabbit who attacks with his ears in a stabbing motion. Holding down the attack button makes him spin his ears, to intercept projectiles. Attacking while jumping makes him spin and attack in all directions.

Release 
The game was released in May 2015 for the NicoNico Game Magazine, a service which distributes independent games. The game was released as freeware, and several are released each month.

The game was released as Pharaoh Rebirth+ on the video game distribution service Steam on March 17, 2016 and published by Degica. Pharaoh Rebirth+ adds Boss Rush, and a hard mode.

Reception 
Destructoid gave it an 8 out of 10.

See also
 Maldita Castilla

References

External links
 Official Website

2016 video games
Action-adventure games
Metroidvania games
Platform games
Video games developed in Japan
Windows games
Windows-only games